Klabunde is a German surname that may refer to the following notable people:
Charles S. Klabunde (born 1935), American artist 
Clara Klabunde (1906–1994), German lawyer
Kristin Klabunde (born 1991), American actress
Niklas Klabunde (born 1993), German/South Korean television personality and model
Reinhard Klabunde, 19th century American politician

References

German-language surnames